Madrid and its metropolitan area has a Mediterranean climate (Köppen climate classification: Csa) which transitions to a cold semi-arid climate (BSk). According to the Troll-Paffen climate classification, Madrid has warm-temperate subtropical climate (Warmgemäßigt-subtropisches Zonenklima) and according to the Siegmund/Frankenberg climate classification, Madrid has a subtropical climate. 
However, the most widespread climate classification is that Madrid presents a climate of transition between the Mediterranean climate (Köppen climate classification: Csa) and the cold semi-arid climate (BSk), with hot summers and relatively cool winters with somewhat frequent frosts (15 days have lows under  on average) and occasional snowfalls, with 3-4 snowy days on average.

Seasons

Spring 

Late Spring, in the months of May and June, is witness to the peak of pollinization of Gramineae, the main culprit behind rhinitis and bronchial asthma in Madrid. Years with high concentrations have proven a public health issue, with punctual cases of asthma epidemics among the inhabitants of Madrid in the aforementioned months.

Sunshine and UV index 
Sunshine duration is 2,769 hours per year, from 124 (4 hours per day in average) in December to 359 (above 11.6 hours per day in average) in July. This is one of the largest number of sunshine duration hours in Europe and this is a bit above average for the southern half of Europe because in this part of the continent, sunshine duration varies from about 2,000 to about 3,000 hours per year. However, this is 70% larger value than in northern half of Europe, where sunshine duration is around 1500 hours per year. In winter Madrid has about three times more sun duration than in the northern half of Europe. Madrid has the second highest UV value of continental Europe after Athens and Lisbon. The values are close to that of Pittsburgh, Pennsylvania as ultraviolet radiation suffers little interference from other geographic variables. Although values are still average, which is not as risky as almost the entire continent, except the afternoons of the warmer months, where exposure should be reduced. The amount varies from 2 between November to January to 9 between June and July.

Precipitation 
Madrid has on average only 63 precipitation days a year, therein average several rainy days per month (≥ 1 mm), ranging from 2 days in July and August to 8 days in May. The average annual precipitation is less than 436 mm (17.87 inches), ranging from 10 mm (0.35 inch) in August to 56 mm in November and December.

Humidity 
Average relative humidity is 57%, ranging from 38% in July to 74% in December.

Snow 

Snowfalls are occasional, happening only a few days per year. In January 1941 8 snow days were recorded, the most for any month.

Temperature extremes 
Higher maximum temperatures have been recorded in other stations.

Daylight 
Madrid enjoys one of the most optimal number of hours of daylight in Europe. Days in winter are not as short as in the northern part of the continent, the average hours of daylight in December, January and February is 10 hours (for comparison: London or Moscow or Warsaw - about 8 hours).

Climatic data for Madrid area

See also 
Climate in other places in Iberian Peninsula:
 Climate of Barcelona
 Climate of Bilbao
 Climate of Valencia
 Climate of Gibraltar
 Climate of Lisbon
 Climate of Spain

References 

Madrid
Madrid
Geography of Madrid